The MAT/6 is an Italian circular synthetic resin-cased minimum metal blast resistant anti-tank blast mine. It uses a pneumatic fuze which is resistant to shock and blast, and is also claimed to be resistant to mine flails and mine rollers. The mine's plastic case is waterproof, and it can be laid in shallow water. Anti-handling devices may be fitted to the mine.

The mine is no longer in production.

Specifications
 Diameter: 270 mm
 Height: 142 mm
 Weight: 7.1 kg
 Explosive content: 6.3 kg
 Operating force: 180 to 310 kg
 Can be placed Underwater

References
 Janes Mines and Mine Clearance 2005-2006
 

Anti-tank mines of Italy